Tender (styled as TENDER) is a British electronic duo formed in London, England, in 2015. Having started from home and self releasing a couple of EPs, they signed to Partisan Records in 2016, and released their debut album, Modern Addiction, in September 2017. Their music has been featured in a number of television shows and movies, most notably the Netflix film To All the Boys I've Loved Before and television show How To Get Away With Murder.

The duo released their second studio album, Fear of Falling Asleep, on 18 January 2019.

Discography

Albums

Extended plays

Band members
 James Cullen – lead vocals, keyboard, synths (2015–present)
 Dan Cobb – backing vocals, keyboard, synths, guitar (2015–present)

References

Musical groups established in 2015
Electropop groups
British electronic music duos
British indie pop groups
2015 establishments in England